Hooven is a census-designated place (CDP) in southeastern Whitewater Township, Hamilton County, Ohio, United States. The population was 464 at the 2020 census. Hooven has a ZIP code of 45033.

Geography
State Route 128 is the main road through the community, running northeast to Miamitown. U.S. Route 50 forms the southern edge of the CDP, and Interstate 275 forms the northwestern edge, with access to Hooven via Exit 21. The Great Miami River is the eastern edge of the community.

Gulf Oil Refinery
The Gulf Oil Company began operations at a facility in Hooven in 1931, producing a variety of products including jet fuel, diesel fuel, gasoline, and home-heating oil. In 1985, the site was acquired by the Chevron Corporation. That same year the U.S. EPA started investigating the site as a result of fuel flowing into the nearby Great Miami River. In 1986, the refinery was closed, eliminating over 200 jobs and severely impacting the local economy of Hooven. Since then, Chevron has been negotiations with the EPA and undergoing major clean up of the site's contaminated soil and groundwater.

The EPA states that during the refinery's operation, an estimated 5 million gallons of refined gasoline and diesel fuel leaked into the local aquifer. The residents of Hooven are supplied clean drinking water from the Cleves public drinking water supply, which was not contaminated by the refinery.

References

Census-designated places in Hamilton County, Ohio
Census-designated places in Ohio